Tod Edward Kowalczyk (born June 19, 1966) is an American college basketball coach and current head men's basketball coach at the University of Toledo.  He was the head coach at the University of Wisconsin-Green Bay from 2002–10, before accepting the head coaching position at Toledo on March 30, 2010.

Head coaching record

References

External links

 Statistics at College Basketball-Reference.com

1966 births
Living people
American men's basketball coaches
American men's basketball players
American people of Polish descent
Basketball coaches from Wisconsin
Basketball players from Wisconsin
College men's basketball head coaches in the United States
Green Bay Phoenix men's basketball coaches
Marquette Golden Eagles men's basketball coaches
Minnesota Duluth Bulldogs men's basketball players
New Hampshire Wildcats men's basketball coaches
Rider Broncs men's basketball coaches
Rutgers Scarlet Knights men's basketball coaches
Sportspeople from Green Bay, Wisconsin